The Kingsmead Viaduct (or Kings Meads Viaduct is a raised dual-carriageway viaduct of the A10 road on the eastern outskirts of Ware, Hertfordshire, England. It carries the A10 over the River Lea, the New River and the Hertford East branch line.

The road was originally constructed as a trunk route by the Highways Agency as the second part of a two-phase improvement of the A10 between Ware and Cheshunt.  On 29 September 2006 the road was de-trunked, and the viaduct is now the responsibility of Hertfordshire County Council.

Major works

The expansion joints were replaced by the Highways Agency in July 2005.

Improvements to the bridge parapets to bring them up to modern standards were carried out by Hertfordshire Council from July to September 2008.

Location
The bridge spans the Lea Valley, crossing the River Lea, the New River and the A119 road between the Rush Green Interchange near Hertford and the Westmill interchange (north-west of Ware).  

Also running along the valley floor is the Hertford East Branch Line, which the viaduct crosses between Ware and the Hertford East terminus. The viaduct crosses the King's Meads Nature Reserve.

References

Bridges in Hertfordshire
Transport in Hertfordshire
Bridges completed in 1976
Box girder bridges
Viaducts in England
1976 establishments in England